Chronicon Roskildense (Danish: Roskildekrøniken English: Roskilde Chronicle) is a small Danish historical work, written in Latin. It is one of the oldest known attempts to write a coherent account of Danish history by a Danish author, spanning from the introduction of Christianity in Denmark to the author's own time.

History
The original chronicle covers the time frame of 826 to ca. 1143. A later addition from the reign of King Valdemar I of Denmark, of a few more pages, takes the chronicle to 1157 when King Valdemar I gains the throne of Denmark; these additional pages are mostly direct quotes from other sources.

The author is unknown, but it is thought to have had some relationship to Roskilde Cathedral. The author is very confident with matters dealing with Roskilde. Churchly matters are not of special interest to the author who writes vividly about all kinds of local matters. Events themselves are only briefly covered while people taking part in them or even causing them are throughout covered with great passion.

Unlike Saxo's Gesta Danorum or Aggesen's Brevis Historia Regum Dacie, Chronicon Roskildense often covers the 'losing' side in these very same events as told by Saxo Grammaticus and Svend Aggesen. At times the author can seem very bitter and blinded by politic; however, this fact also makes this chronicle a very interesting piece of work.
The early part of the work is in many cases based on Adam of Bremen's Descriptio insularum Aquilonis, sometimes even using direct quotes. However, the author only takes what is needed and the meaning is not always the same.

As with many Danish chronicles, the exact time of writing is not known with certainty. The original chronicle ends very suddenly. The last subject written about concerns the quarrel between Bishop Rike of Schleswig and Bishop Eskil of Lund over the Archbishop seat of Lund between 1137 and 1138.   Olaf "II" Haraldsen, the son of Harald Kesja  who is killed in 1143, is still alive as of the writing. With these in mind, the book must have been finished ca. 1143.

The original manuscript is lost today and the chronicle exists now only in copies made in the 13th, 16th and 17th centuries. Copies in Latin reside in:
 University Library, Kiel, S. H. 8 A.8° (13th century). Known as Codex Kiloniensis.
 Den Arnamagnæanske Samling, Copenhagen, AM 107 8o (16th century). 
 Uppsala University Library, De la Gardie XXV-XXIX (17th century).

References

Other sources
Jørgen Olrik (1888) Den Ældeste Danmarkskrønike (Roskildekrøniken)  (Copenhagen: Nielsen & Lydiche)
 Lotte Fang (1979) Roskildekrøniken - Den ældeste Danmarkshistorie  (Viborg: Forlag Sesam A/S)

Related reading
DuBois, Thomas Andrew (2008) Sanctity in the North: Saints, Lives, and Cults in Medieval Scandinavia (University of Toronto Press)  
Medieval Latin historical texts
Danish chronicles
12th-century history books
12th-century Latin books
History of Roskilde
Works of unknown authorship